Birky is an urban-type settlement in Kharkiv Raion of Kharkiv Oblast in Ukraine. Birky belongs to Nova Vodolaha settlement hromada, one of the hromadas of Ukraine. Population: 

Until 18 July 2020, Birky belonged to Nova Vodolaha Raion. The raion was abolished in July 2020 as part of the administrative reform of Ukraine, which reduced the number of raions of Kharkiv Oblast to seven. The area of Nova Vodolaha Raion was split between Kharkiv and Krasnohrad Raions, with Birky being transferred to Kharkiv Raion.

Economy

Transportation
There is some passenger traffic.

The settlement has access to Highway M18 and Highway M20 which connect Kharkiv with Dnipro, as well as to roads running to Lozova and Izium.

References

Urban-type settlements in Kharkiv Raion